Kepler-102 is a star in the constellation of Lyra. Kepler-102 is less luminous than the Sun. The star system does not contain any observable amount of dust. Kepler-102 is suspected to be orbited by a binary consisting of two red dwarf stars, at projected separations of 591 and 627 AU.

Planetary system
In January 2014, a system of five planets around the star was announced, three of them being smaller than Earth. While 3 of the transit signals were discovered during the first year of the Kepler mission, their small size made them hard to confirm as possibilities of these being false positives were needed to be removed. Later, two other signals were detected. Follow-up radial velocity data helped to determine the mass of the largest planet (Kepler-102e).

In 2017, the search for additional planets utilizing Transit-timing variation method has yielded zero results, although presence of planets with semimajor axis beyond 10 AU cannot be excluded.

See also
 Copernicus (star)
 Kepler-37
 Kepler-20
 Kepler-33

References

Lyra (constellation)
82
Planetary systems with five confirmed planets
K-type main-sequence stars
Planetary transit variables
J18455585+4712289